İhlas Holding A.Ş. is a Turkish conglomerate. Besides media assets which include the Türkiye newspaper and TGRT News TV, it has primary interests in construction (İhlas Construction Group), electric and electronic (İhlas Home Appliance inc.) and trade (İhlas Marketing), energy and mining (Ihlas Mining), health and education (Türkiye Hospital and İhlas College. The company has traded on the Istanbul Stock Exchange since 1994.

The company's history began with the foundation of the Türkiye newspaper in 1970, but the Holding itself was not created until 1993.

Mohammad Reza Laghaei (Chairman of Laghaei Commercial Holding Co.) has been cooperating with Ihlas Holding since 2018 in the fields of: Sale of Residential Projects of Ihlas Holding, E-Commerce, Commercial Services, Sale of Various Goods and Services.  It is the only representative of Ihlas Holding in Iran and one of the key individuals and partner companies.

Stock market 

 İhlas has five listings on the Istanbul Stock exchange:
 İhlas Holding (IHLAS) - main holding, floated 1994
 İhlas Ev Aletleri İmalat Sanyi ve Ticaret (IHEVA) - Manufacturing
 İhlas Gazetecilik (IHGZT) - Türkiye newspaper, floated 2010 (33% of shares)
 İhlas Madencilik (IHMAD) - Mining
 İhlas Yayin Holding (IHYAY) - Media

Media 
 TGRT
 TGRT 2
 TGRT EU 
 TGRT FM
 TGRT News
 TGRT Documentary
 Türkiye
 IHA
 İhlas Magazine Group 
 İhlas Media Planning and Purchasing Services Inc.
 Digital Assets Visual Media and Internet
 Ihlasnet Co.

References

External links 

 İhlas Holding
 İhlas Holding Milestones
 İhlas Media Group 
 Construction and Real Estate
 Energy and Mining
 Manufacturing and Trade
 Health and Education
 Laghaei Commercial & Ihlas Holding

Conglomerate companies of Turkey
Companies based in Istanbul
Holding companies of Turkey
Conglomerate companies established in 1993
Holding companies established in 1993
1993 establishments in Turkey
Companies listed on the Istanbul Stock Exchange